The 2008 Women's Premier Soccer League season was the 12th season of the WPSL.

Ajax America Women finished the season as national champions, beating Arizona Rush in the WPSL Championship game in Sacramento, California on 3 August 2008.

Changes From 2007

Name Changes
Lamorinda East Bay Power changed their name to Walnut Creek Power

New Franchises
Nineteen franchises joined the league this year:

Folding
Five teams left the league prior to the beginning of the season:
FC Indiana—left to join USL W-League
Real Shore FC
River Cities FC
Rush Salt Lake City
Tampa Bay Elite
In addition, four 2007 teams chose to spend the 2008 season on hiatus, with plans to return in 2009:
Bay State Select
Maryland Pride
Massachusetts Stingers
Orlando Falcons

Final standings
Purple indicates division title clinched
Green indicates playoff berth clinched

Pacific Conference

North Division

South Division

Big Sky Conference

North Division

South Division

 Despite winning their division, Oklahoma Alliance did not take part in the WPSL playoffs.

Sunshine Conference

Midwest Conference

East Conference

North Division

Mid-Atlantic Division

Playoffs

References

External links
 WPSL Standings

Women's Premier Soccer League seasons
Wom
1